Păcii (eng. [of the] peace) is a metro station in Bucharest. Part of the boulevard under which it resides used to bear the station's name. It is located on Iuliu Maniu Avenue at the intersection with Valea Cascadelor Avenue, the latter being a proposal for a new name for the station. The station was opened on 19 August 1983 as part of the extension from Eroilor to Industriilor.

Extension
An extension towards the A1 Motorway and the Western Industrial Park is planned for 2030.

References

Bucharest Metro stations
Railway stations opened in 1983
1983 establishments in Romania